Gabriele Agnolo, also known as Gabriele d'Angelo (died 1510) was an Italian architect active in Naples in the early-Renaissance manner.

He was born in Naples, and followed in the style of the contemporaries, Novello da San Lucano and Giovanni Francesco Mormando. He was active in 1480, and participated in work on the church of Santa Maria Egiziaca a Forcella and San Giuseppe. He designed the Palazzo Orsini a Gravina.

Sources

1510 deaths
Architects from Naples
15th-century Italian architects
Year of birth unknown